RKSD College of Pharmacy is a college providing pharmacy education. This college is in Kaithal, India and is run by Rashtriy Vadya Samiti (Regd.). The college is affiliated from Pt. B.D. Sharma PGIMS Rohtak for B. Pharma. & M. Pharma. courses and from Kurukshetra University for D.Pharma course.

External links
College official website
PGIMS, Rohtak website
Kurukshetra University website

References

Educational institutions established in 2004
Kaithal
Pharmacy schools in India
Universities and colleges in Haryana
Kurukshetra University
2004 establishments in Haryana